Jahan Nama (also Romanized as Jahān Namā and Jahān Nemā) is a village in Beyza Rural District, Beyza District, Sepidan County, Fars Province, Iran. At the 2006 census, its population was 85, in 19 families.

References 

Populated places in Beyza County